The Trojan Men is an all-gender lower voice a cappella group at the University of Southern California. Founded in 2005, the group has participated in and earned numerous awards from competitions such as the International Championship of Collegiate A Cappella and USC's Absolut A Cappella contest. The group currently performs around USC, Los Angeles, and Long Beach area.

History

The Trojan Men was founded in January 2005 by then-freshman Evan Bregman. Nine people auditioned in the initial stages, and the group had its first performance on March 3, 2005 with five members. They sang three songs: "In the Still of the Night", "If I Ever Fall in Love", and Bregman's original arrangement of "California, Here I Come".

The group has grown steadily in number and popularity. In 2006, they competed in the ICCA for the first time, placing third in their quarterfinal behind BYU Noteworthy and that year's eventual International Champions, BYU Vocal Point. They were also honored with a Best Soloist award. That same year, they competed in USC's annual Absolut A Cappella contest, placing in first above ICCA finalist USC Reverse Osmosis. Again, they were honored with a Best Soloist award.

The group is famous for their tradition of singing Alfred the Aligator before every single rehearsal. Joey Blundell knew it really well.

2006–2007
With momentum building around them on campus, The Trojan Men decided to spend the Fall 2006 semester preparing a specialty repertoire of multi-denominational Holiday music. This culminated in their first annual Holiday Concert on December 3, 2006. Eschewing the established campus format of concerts with multiple groups singing only four or five songs, the concert featured only The Trojan Men, singing a dozen songs. Many of these songs have since gained popularity through the group's YouTube Channel.

The following semester, the group competed in the ICCAs again, placing third in their quarterfinal and again winning a Best Soloist award. In that year's Absolut A Cappella contest, they placed third as well.

2007–2008
In the final year of the group's founding members, focus turned to establishing the group as a sustainable entity on campus. The fall 2007 semester saw the group as strong as ever, with 45 auditionees. For the first time, new members had arrived at USC with knowledge of the group and intent to audition. One week later, the group was the featured performer and clinician at the second annual Las Vegas A Cappella Summit.

Continuing the trend of breaking with established USC a cappella tradition, the group scheduled their first concert of the semester one week after other campus groups, associating it with USC's Homecoming festivities and again performing a dozen songs. At the concert, the group announced that their second annual Holiday Concert would be the first by a USC a cappella group to be held in Bovard Auditorium with a small admission fee.

The second annual Holiday Concert was held on December 6, 2007. Nearly 500 people were in attendance as The Trojan Men performed 20 songs, a total of 90 minutes of music capped by two short videos. The concert was recorded for a future CD and DVD release. The group financed the entire show themselves using funds acquired from previous performances and private donations.

The spring semester of 2008 was focused on recording the group's debut album, Take Root. The album was released May 4, 2008, the night of the group's end of the year spring concert held again in Bovard Auditorium.

2016–2017
Flash forward roughly 10 years later, and the newest members of The Trojan Men are still actively performing all over the Los Angeles tri-state area. While they still hold onto classic songs including Etta James' "At Last" and Corinne Bailey Rae's "Put Your Records On", they are constantly cycling through new material to be performed for friends, family, and fans.

The group no longer competes in competitions.

2017–2018
That fall, The Men performed a 13th anniversary "Bar Mitzvah" concert – performing songs from the years of the group's birth. Highlights included Vanessa Carlton's "A Thousand Miles", Owl City's "Fireflies", and The Jonas Brothers' "Year 3000". While we performed a few of The Trojan Men Classics, new arrangements from Colin Petersdorf, Landon Fadel, and Austin Karkowsky brought a new energy to the group and its audience.

For the first time in the group's history, The Trojan Men performed their winter concert with The Sirens, USC's only all-female a cappella group.

2018–2019
In January, the group sang the National Anthem for a USC Basketball game and learned a record 21 arrangements in the semester. With Ben Shiff, Gerry Hartman, Joey Blundell, and Stephen Jung emerging as new arrangers, the growing group continued to explore their vibe and dynamic as well as repertoire.

2019–2020
The group welcomed Alex Oliva, Sam Guillemette, Nick Springer, and Avery Streater into the group. One song that they sung was Dancing in the Moonlight.

2020-2021
Following the suspension of all in-person activities at the University of Southern California in response to the COVID-19 pandemic, membership dwindled and participation was at an all-time low. Attempts to record and produce videos of each individual member stitched together were unsuccessful and, like most artistic clubs and a cappella groups on campus, The Trojan Men were on the brink of breaking up. Current president and vice-president Timothy Reilly and Luke Sobolevitch, respectively, were determined to make an effort to bring the group back to its former skill and prestige. With the commencement of the fall 2021 semester, members past and present assembled and performed at that semester's All-Hail Showcase. The exposure the showcase offered brought many new prospective members, and, following the audition process, the group stood at a solid 13. The Trojan Men once again performed their winter concert with The Sirens, featuring arrangements of Perfect and I Wanna Dance with Somebody (Who Loves Me).

2021-2022 
The Trojan men gained 6 new members during their 2021-2022 season. George Vagujhelyi, Daniel Marable, Strad Slater, Siddhant Bajaj, Ethan Kaiser and Thomas Colgalzier all became members of the all male A-Capella group. The group went on to have several performance opportunities — including their winter and spring concert. The group was also given the opportunity to perform at the banquet for USC School of Pharmacy.

Albums
The group recorded their first album at Asylum Studios, home of singer/songwriter/a cappella producer Gabriel Mann, engineered by Chris Harrison, former director of UCLA Awaken A Cappella.

Awards

2006
 3rd Place - ICCA quarterfinal
 Best Soloist: Evan Bregman on Shout (Parts 1&2) 
 1st Place - Absolut A Cappella
 Best Soloist: Evan Bregman on Shout (Parts 1&2)

2007
 3rd Place - ICCA quarterfinal 
 Best Soloist: Tien Nguyen on Don't Stop Me Now
 3rd Place - Absolut A Cappella
 Best Performance: Tien Nguyen on Don't Stop Me Now

2008
 2nd Place - Absolut A Cappella
 Best Soloists: The Trojan Men on Justin Timberlake Medley

2009
 1st Place - Absolut A Cappella
 Best Arrangement: Cy Serrano on Ribbon in the Sky

External links
 Official Website
 Instagram

References

Student activities at the University of Southern California
Collegiate a cappella groups
American vocal groups
Musical groups established in 2005
2005 establishments in California